Arlington Park is one of two commuter railroad stations along Metra's Union Pacific Northwest Line in the village of Arlington Heights, Illinois.

The Arlington Park station was designed originally to serve just the Arlington Park Race Track, but now serves postal employees at the Processing and Distribution Center in Palatine, Illinois as well as residents of southeast Palatine and west Arlington Heights, although a fence blocks most of the access to the station from the Palatine side. Despite its original purpose as a racetrack station, Arlington Park is located along the Union Pacific Northwest Line's main line, rather than a spur or a sidetrack. No bus connections are available.

As of April 25, 2022, Arlington Park is served by 46 trains (22 inbound, 24 outbound) on weekdays, by 33 trains (16 inbound, all 17 outbound) on Saturdays, and by 20 trains (nine inbound, all 11 outbound) on Sundays.

Parking is available within a section of the track complex's property dedicated for Metra commuter parking. As of June 2010, the price was $1.50 per day. The commuter parking lot is operated by Imperial Parking Corporation, operating as Impark. Impark has sometimes drawn criticism over business practices related to parking payment; at this lot in particular, commuters are required to pay a surcharge to use pay-by-phone when the lot's payment machines are out of order.

References

External links

Metra - Arlington Park Station
Station from Google Maps Street View

Arlington Park
Arlington Park Station
Former Chicago and North Western Railway stations
Railway stations in Cook County, Illinois
Railway stations in the United States opened in 1975